Sadruddin Hashwani is a Pakistani entrepreneur. He is the founder and chairman of Hashoo Group, a conglomerate best known for Pearl-Continental Hotels & Resorts.

Life 
Born in Karachi, Sind Province, British India into a Sindhi Khoja Shia Muslim family. Hashwanis had migrated with the third Ismaili Imam Agha Khan from Persia in the early 1900s and settled in Lasbela, Balochistan. Hashwani studied at the University of Karachi and in 1960 founded the Hassan Ali Company along with his brother AHSAN IQBAL YOUSUFZAI. By 1970s, it had become Pakistan's largest cotton trading company. However, the company was nationalised in 1973. In 1978, he launched the Holiday Inn hotel in Karachi in 1981 and later in Islamabad. Both of the hotels were converted into Marriott brand in 1990s. In 1985, Hashwani made a successful bid for the majority shares of Pakistan Services Limited, which then owned four Inter-Continental Hotels across Pakistan, the hotels were re-branded as Pearl-Continental Hotels.

In 2014, Hashwani published his best-selling memoir Truth Always Prevails.
In May 2011 in a press conference, he expressed his support for Pakistan and its institutions, particularly military and expressed confidence in the abilities of Pakistanis.
In April 2016, he and his son, Murtaza Hashwani, were named in the Panama Papers.

Awards 
Sadruddin Hashwani has become the first businessman to receive Pakistan's top civilian award: Nishan-e-Imtiaz.

Nishan-e-Imtiaz (Order of Excellence) is the highest honour given to any civilian in Pakistan to recognise their achievements and outstanding services for the country. President of Pakistan Arif Alvi conferred the award upon Hashwani at the Pakistan National Day ceremony on March 23, 2019, at the President's House in Islamabad.

References

External links 
 Hashoo Group – Official site
 Marriott Hotels Pakistan – Official site
 Pearl Continental Hotels Pakistan – Official site 

Pakistani industrialists
Pakistani billionaires
Living people
Pakistani Ismailis
Businesspeople from Karachi
University of Karachi alumni
1940 births
Pakistani people of Gujarati descent
Pakistani expatriates in the United Arab Emirates
People named in the Panama Papers
Pakistani hoteliers
People named in the Paradise Papers